Boris Raspudić (Serbian Cyrillic: Борис Распудић; born 11 October 1982) is a Bosnian Serb retired footballer, who currently is football manager of Sloga Trn in the Second League of the Republika Srpska.

Club career
Raspudic played for Borac Banja Luka in the Premijer Liga before transferring to Petrochimi Tabriz F.C. alongside Bojan Tadić in 2008. In summer 2010 he joined Borac Banja Luka.

On 25 November 2013, Raspudić went on a two-week trial with S.League side Brunei DPMM. Following the completion of the trial Brunei DPMM announced they would be signing Raspudić along with Joe Gamble and Robert Alviž.

On May 21, 2021, Raspudić announced that he would end his career at the end of the season and become active as a coach in football.

International career
He played once for Bosnia and Herzegovina, in a December 2010 friendly match against Poland in which he came on as a second half substitute for Dario Purić.

Career statistics

Honours
DPMM FC
S.League (1): 2015
Singapore League Cup (1): 2014

References

External links
 
 
 
 Interview at Borac BL official site.

1982 births
Living people
Sportspeople from Banja Luka
Serbs of Bosnia and Herzegovina
Association football central defenders
Bosnia and Herzegovina footballers
Bosnia and Herzegovina international footballers
FK Borac Banja Luka players
Petrochimi Tabriz F.C. players
DPMM FC players
FK Kozara Gradiška players
First League of the Republika Srpska players
Premier League of Bosnia and Herzegovina players
Azadegan League players
Singapore Premier League players
Bosnia and Herzegovina expatriate footballers
Expatriate footballers in Brunei
Expatriate footballers in Iran
Bosnia and Herzegovina expatriate sportspeople in Iran